Quicksilver may refer to:

 Quicksilver (metal), the chemical element mercury

Arts and entertainment

Music 
 Quicksilver, a bluegrass band fronted by Doyle Lawson
 "Quicksilver" (song), a 1950 hit for Bing Crosby
 Quicksilver (soundtrack), from the 1986 film
 Quicksilver (album), an album by Quicksilver Messenger Service
 Quicksilver (EP), a 2009 EP by The Crüxshadows
 "Quicksilver Lightning", a song by Roger Daltrey
 "Quicksilver" (instrumental), 1969 instrumental from Pink Floyd album Soundtrack from the Film More
 Shortened name form of Quicksilver Messenger Service, used by the band on their later record covers
 "Quicksilver Girl" (song), Steve Miller Band, 1968 album Sailor
 Quicksilver, a classical music ensemble directed by Robert Mealy & Julie Andrijeski

Film and television 
 Quicksilver (Irish game show), an Irish quiz show
 Quicksilver (film), a 1986 film

Fictional entities 
 Quicksilver (Marvel Comics), a superhero in the Marvel Comics universe
 Quicksilver (DC Comics), or Max Mercury, a superhero in the DC Comics universe
 Quicksilver, leader of the SilverHawks on the 1986 animated television series SilverHawks
 Quicksilver, a fictional synthetic hormone in The Invisible Man
 Quicksilver, a dragon in The World of Ice & Fire and Fire & Blood

Other arts 
 Quicksilver (novel), first volume of The Baroque Cycle by Neal Stephenson

Aircraft
 Eipper Quicksilver
 Quicksilver GT500
 USS Quicksilver (SP-281), US Navy patrol vessel

Computing
 QuickSilver (project), a software research project at Cornell University
 Quicksilver (software), an open source application launcher for Mac OS X
 QuickSilver, Broadvision desktop publishing software, formerly by Interleaf

Organizations
 Quicksilver Manufacturing, an aircraft company 
 Quicksilver (ISP), a New Zealand internet service provider

Entertainment
 Quicksilver (company), UK's largest amusement arcade company
 Quiksilver, a surf and sports related apparel brand
 Quicksilver Software, a computer-games company
 Las Vegas Quicksilvers, a former soccer team

People 
 DJ Quicksilver (born 1964), electronic musician
 Quicksilver (wrestler), born Richard Clements, American professional wrestler

Other uses
 Quicksilver, a locomotive of Great Western Railway 3031 Class
 Quixilver, either of two robotics teams at Leland High School (San Jose, California)

See also
 Doyle Lawson & Quicksilver, a band
 Operation Quicksilver (disambiguation)